Merismodes is a genus of fungi in the Niaceae family. The genus has a widespread distribution and contains 20 species.

References

Niaceae
Agaricales genera